Maruya is the oldest hatcho miso continuous producer in Japan founded in 1337. It is located in Okazaki city in Aichi Prefecture.

The production of the miso bean paste is made using traditional methods and Maruya received the ISO9001 certification.

Hatcho miso is a type of red miso made using soy, renowned for its dense, rich flavour and relatively low salt content compared with certain types of rice-based miso.

See also 
List of oldest companies

References

External links 
Homepage

Companies based in Aichi Prefecture
Companies established in the 14th century
1330s establishments in Japan
Japanese brands